Rivers Provincial Park is a provincial park in the Canadian province of Manitoba, designated by the Government of Manitoba in 1961.

See also
List of protected areas of Manitoba
Lake Wahtopanah
Little Saskatchewan River

References

External links
Find Your Favorite Park: Rivers Provincial Park

Provincial parks of Manitoba
Protected areas of Manitoba